Static is the third album by the Italian dance group Planet Funk. It was released in 2006 through EMI. Vocal parts are interpreted by Luke Allen, except track 10, which is sung by Jovanotti.

Track listing

Charts

References

External links

2006 albums
Planet Funk albums

it:Static (album)